Anatoly Libgober (born 1949, in Moscow) is a Russian/American mathematician, known for work in algebraic geometry and topology of algebraic varieties''.

Early life

Libgober was born in the Soviet Union, and immigrated to 
Israel in 1973 after active participation in the movement to change immigration policies 
in Soviet Union. He studied with Yuri Manin at Moscow University and with Boris Moishezon at Tel-Aviv 
University where he finished his PhD dissertation with Moishezon in 1977, doing his postdoctorate work at the [[Institute
for Advanced Study]] (Princeton, N.J). He lectured extensively visiting, among others, l'Institut des hautes études scientifiques (Bures sur Ivette, France), the Max Planck Institute in Bonn (Germany), the Mathematical Sciences Research Institute (Berkeley), Harvard University and Columbia University. Currently he is Professor Emeritus at the University of Illinois at Chicago where he worked until his retirement in 2010.

Professional profile

Libgober's early work studies the diffeomorphism type 
of complete intersections in complex projective space. This later led to the discovery of relations between Hodge and Chern numbers. 
He introduced the technique of Alexander polynomial
for the study of fundamental groups of 
the complements to plane algebraic curves. This led to Libgober's 
divisibility theorem and explicit relations 
between these fundamental groups, the position of singularities, and local 
invariants of singularities (the constants of quasi-adjunction). Later he  
introduced the characteristic varieties of the fundamental
groups, providing a multivariable extension of Alexander polynomials,
and applied these  methods to the study of homotopy 
groups of the complements to hypersurfaces in projective 
spaces and the topology of arrangements of hyperplanes. 
In the early 90s he started work on interactions between 
algebraic geometry and physics, providing mirror 
symmetry predictions for the count of rational curves on 
complete intersections  in projective spaces and 
developing the theory of elliptic genus of singular algebraic varieties.

References

1949 births
Living people
Mathematicians from Moscow
Tel Aviv University alumni
20th-century American mathematicians
Soviet mathematicians
Columbia University faculty
21st-century American mathematicians
Soviet emigrants to Israel